Stubal is a village in the municipality of Aleksandrovac, Serbia. According to the 2002 census, the village has a population of  616 people.

Demographics (2002 census)

References

Populated places in Rasina District